Ira Gershwin (born Israel Gershovitz; December 6, 1896 – August 17, 1983) was an American lyricist who collaborated with his younger brother, composer George Gershwin, to create some of the most memorable songs in the English language of the 20th century. With George, he wrote more than a dozen Broadway shows, featuring songs such as "I Got Rhythm", "Embraceable You", "The Man I Love" and "Someone to Watch Over Me". He was also responsible, along with DuBose Heyward, for the libretto to George's opera Porgy and Bess.

The success the Gershwin brothers had with their collaborative works has often overshadowed the creative role that Ira played. His mastery of songwriting continued after George's early death in 1937. Ira wrote additional hit songs with composers Jerome Kern, Kurt Weill, Harry Warren and Harold Arlen. His critically acclaimed 1959 book Lyrics on Several Occasions, an amalgam of autobiography and annotated anthology, is an important source for studying the art of the lyricist in the golden age of American popular song.

Life and career 
Gershwin was born at 60 Eldridge St in Manhattan, the oldest of four children of Morris (Moishe) and Rose Gershovitz (née Rosa Bruskin), who were Russian Jews from Saint Petersburg and who had emigrated to the United States in 1891. Ira's siblings were George (Jacob, b. 1898), Arthur (b. 1900), and Frances (b. 1906).  Morris changed the family name to "Gershwine" (or alternatively "Gershvin") well before their children rose to fame; it was not spelled "Gershwin" until later. Shy in his youth, Ira spent much of his time at home reading, but from grammar school through college, he played a prominent part in several school newspapers and magazines.

He graduated in 1914 from Townsend Harris High School, a public school for intellectually gifted students, where he met Yip Harburg, with whom he enjoyed a lifelong friendship and a love of Gilbert and Sullivan. He attended the City College of New York but dropped out.

The childhood home of Ira and George Gershwin was in the center of the Yiddish Theater District, on the second floor at 91 Second Avenue, between East 5th Street and East 6th Street. They frequented the local Yiddish theaters.

While George began composing and "plugging" in Tin Pan Alley from the age of 18, Ira worked as a cashier in his father's Turkish baths. It was not until 1921 that Ira became involved in the music business. Alex Aarons signed Ira to write the songs for his next show, Two Little Girls in Blue, ultimately produced by Abraham Erlanger, along with co-composers Vincent Youmans and Paul Lannin. So as not to appear to trade off George's growing reputation, Ira wrote under the pseudonym "Arthur Francis", after his youngest two siblings. His lyrics were well received, allowing him successfully to enter the show-business world with just one show. Later the same year, the Gershwins collaborated for the first time on a score; this was for A Dangerous Maid, which played in Atlantic City and on tour.

It was not until 1924 that Ira and George teamed up to write the music for what became their first Broadway hit Lady, Be Good. Once the brothers joined forces, their combined talents became one of the most influential forces in the history of American Musical Theatre. "When the Gershwins teamed up to write songs for Lady, Be Good, the American musical found its native idiom." Together, they wrote the music for more than 12 shows and four films. Some of their more famous works include "The Man I Love", "Fascinating Rhythm", "Someone to Watch Over Me", "I Got Rhythm" and "They Can't Take That Away from Me". Their partnership continued until George's sudden death from a brain tumor in 1937. Following his brother's death, Ira waited nearly three years before writing again.

After this temporary retirement, Ira teamed up with accomplished composers such as Jerome Kern (Cover Girl); Kurt Weill (Where Do We Go from Here?; Lady in the Dark); and Harold Arlen (Life Begins at 8:40; A Star Is Born). Over the next 14 years, Gershwin continued to write the lyrics for many film scores and a few Broadway shows. But the failure of Park Avenue in 1946 (a "smart" show about divorce, co-written with composer Arthur Schwartz) was his farewell to Broadway. As he wrote at the time, "Am reading a couple of stories for possible musicalization (if there is such a word) but I hope I don't like them as I think I deserve a long rest."

In 1947, he took 11 songs George had written but never used, provided them with new lyrics, and incorporated them into the Betty Grable film The Shocking Miss Pilgrim. He later wrote comic lyrics for Billy Wilder's 1964 movie Kiss Me, Stupid, although most critics believe his final major work was for the 1954 Judy Garland film A Star Is Born.

American singer, pianist and musical historian Michael Feinstein worked for Gershwin in the lyricist's latter years, helping him with his archive. Several lost musical treasures were unearthed during this period, and Feinstein performed some of the material. Feinstein's book The Gershwins and Me: A Personal History in Twelve Songs about working for Ira, and George and Ira's music, was published in 2012.

According to a 1999 story in Vanity Fair, Ira Gershwin's love for loud music was as great as his wife's loathing of it. When Debby Boone—daughter-in-law of his neighbor Rosemary Clooney—returned from Japan with one of the first Sony Walkmans (utilizing cassette tape), Clooney gave it to Michael Feinstein to give to Ira, "so he could crank it in his ears, you know. And he said, 'This is absolutely wonderful!' And he called his broker and bought Sony stock!"

Personal life
Gershwin married Leonore (née Strunsky) in 1926.  He died of heart disease in Beverly Hills, California, on 17 August 1983 at the age of 86. He is interred at Westchester Hills Cemetery, Hastings-on-Hudson, New York. Leonore died in 1991.

Awards and honors
Three of Ira Gershwin's songs ("They Can't Take That Away From Me" (1937), "Long Ago (And Far Away)" (1944) and "The Man That Got Away" (1954)) were nominated for an Academy Award for Best Original Song, though none won.

Along with George S Kaufman and Morrie Ryskind, he was a recipient of the 1932 Pulitzer Prize for Drama for Of Thee I Sing.

In 1988 UCLA established The George and Ira Gershwin Lifetime Musical Achievement Award in recognition of the brothers' contribution to music, and for their gift to UCLA of the fight song "Strike Up the Band for UCLA". Recipients include Angela Lansbury (1988), Ray Charles (1991), Mel Tormé (1994), Bernadette Peters (1995), Frank Sinatra (2000), Stevie Wonder (2002), k.d. lang (2003), James Taylor (2004), Babyface (2005), Burt Bacharach (2006), Quincy Jones (2007), Lionel Richie (2008) and Julie Andrews (2009).

Legacy 
Ira Gershwin was a joyous listener to the sounds of the modern world. "He had a sharp eye and ear for the minutiae of living." He noted in a diary: "Heard in a day: An elevator's purr, telephone's ring, telephone's buzz, a baby's moans, a shout of delight, a screech from a 'flat wheel', hoarse honks, a hoarse voice, a tinkle, a match scratch on sandpaper, a deep resounding boom of dynamiting in the impending subway, iron hooks on the gutter."

In 1987, Ira's widow, Leonore, established the Ira Gershwin Literacy Center at University Settlement, a century-old institution at 185 Eldridge Street on the Lower East Side, New York City. The center is designed to give English-language programs to primarily Hispanic and Chinese Americans. Ira and his younger brother George spent many after-school hours at the Settlement.

The George and Ira Gershwin Collection and the Ira Gershwin Files from the Law Office of Leonard Saxe are both at the Library of Congress Music Division. The Edward Jablonski and Lawrence D. Stewart Gershwin Collection at the Harry Ransom Humanities Research Center at the University of Texas at Austin holds a number of Ira's manuscripts and other material.

In 2007, the United States Library of Congress named its Prize for Popular Song after him and his brother George. Recognizing the profound and positive effect of American popular music on the world's culture, the prize will be given annually to a composer or performer whose lifetime contributions exemplify the standard of excellence associated with the Gershwins.

Notable songs 
 "But Not for Me"
 "Embraceable You"
 "How Long Has This Been Going On?"
 "I Can't Get Started"
 "I Got Rhythm"
 "I've Got a Crush on You"
 "Let's Call the Whole Thing Off"
 "Love Is Here To Stay"
 "My Ship" (music by Kurt Weill)
 "Nice Work If You Can Get It"
 "Oh, Lady Be Good"
 "'S Wonderful"
 "Someone to Watch Over Me"
 "Strike Up the Band"
 "The Man I Love"
 "The Man That Got Away"
 "They All Laughed"
 "They Can't Take That Away from Me"

References

Sources
 
 
 
 Pollack, Howard. George Gershwin: his life and work. University of California Press, 2006

External links 

 
 
 

 The Library of Congress George and Ira Gershwin Collection and The Gershwin Legacy
The Ira Gershwin files from the law office of Leonard Saxe at the Library of Congress
 Ira Gershwin Collection  at the Harry Ransom Center at the University of Texas at Austin
 Gershwin fan site
 
 Ira Gershwin recordings at the Discography of American Historical Recordings.

1896 births
1983 deaths
American musical theatre librettists
American musical theatre lyricists
Broadway composers and lyricists
Burials at Westchester Hills Cemetery
City College of New York alumni
Columbia University alumni
Congressional Gold Medal recipients
Jewish American songwriters
Pulitzer Prize for Drama winners
Writers from Manhattan
People from Beverly Hills, California
Ira
Townsend Harris High School alumni
American people of Russian-Jewish descent
People from the East Village, Manhattan
Porgy and Bess